Katar is a village in the Uttara Kannada district in Karnataka, India.

See also
 Uttara Kannada
 Districts of Karnataka

Villages in Uttara Kannada district